ESO 235-58 is a galaxy in the constellation of Indus.

Its exact nature is uncertain. At first glance, it appears like a barred spiral galaxy seen face on. However, further examination has shown that what appears to be the bar is actually the main structure of an edge-on spiral galaxy, and the galaxy has structure like that of polar-ring galaxies.

References

Indus (constellation)
ESO objects
Spiral galaxies
Polar-ring galaxies